Shadow Puppets is a 2007 horror film directed by Michael Winnick.

Plot
Eight strangers with no memories who find themselves trapped in an abandoned facility. As they desperately try to find answers and escape, a menacing shadow attempts to have them killed.

Cast
Jolene Blalock as Kate Adams
Tony Todd as Steve Garrett 
James Marsters as Jack Dillon
Marc Winnick as Charlie 
Natasha Alam as Amber Diane McCormik
Diahnna Nicole Baxter as Stacey Gibson 
Richard Whiten as Dave 
Jennie Ford as Melissa Tucker

Release
The film was released in June 2007.

References

External links

Shadow Puppets Review at BeenToTheMovies.com

2007 films
American horror films
2007 horror films
2000s English-language films
2000s American films